William Elmer Holt (October 14, 1884 – March 1, 1945) was an American politician. He served as the tenth Governor of Montana from 1935 to 1937.

Biography
Holt was born in Savannah, Missouri, and moved with his family to a ranch in Miles City, Montana. He graduated from the University of Nebraska in 1902. He married Lora Howe and they had two children.

Career
Holt was elected to the Montana House of Representatives in 1912, and served one term. He was a member of the Montana State Senate from 1933 to 1935, and was chosen as president pro tempore in 1935. He became governor upon the death of Governor Frank Henry Cooney on December 15, 1935. Holt was defeated for reelection in 1936. He served as the delegate to Democratic National Convention from Montana in 1936.

Holt retired from political life, and later served as a land agent for Northern Pacific Railroad in Seattle, Washington.

Death
Holt died on March 1, 1945, in Seattle, Washington, where he was with the Northern Pacific Land Office.

References

External links
 State of Montana governors list
National Governors Association biography
Former Montana Governors
Montana Historical Society
The Political Graveyard

1884 births
1945 deaths
University of Nebraska–Lincoln alumni
Democratic Party members of the Montana House of Representatives
Democratic Party Montana state senators
Democratic Party governors of Montana
People from Savannah, Missouri
Methodists from Montana
People from Miles City, Montana
20th-century American politicians